Women's property rights are property and inheritance rights enjoyed by women as a category within a society.

Property rights are claims to property that are legally and socially recognized and enforceable by external legitimized authority. Broadly defined, land rights can be understood as a variety of legitimate claims to land and the benefits and products produced on that land. Inheritance, transfers from the State, tenancy arrangements, and land purchase are all constructs of land rights. These rights can be in the form of actual ownership or usufruct, the rights of use.

Global overview
Women play an integral part in the production of food and goods, from work in fields, factories, and home-based business across the globe. There is a critical relationship in the role that women play and the sustenance provided for families, communities, and nations. Globally, an estimated 41% of women headed households live below the locally defined poverty line, with one-third of the world's women either homeless or living in inadequate housing facilities. The additional exclusion of women from access to land pushes them towards cities, where they often join the ranks of increasing number of women-headed households in slum areas. However, through the processes of globalization and industrialization, there has been a noted increase in the numbers of women entering in the waged labor sectors. Rural women are solely responsible for half of the world's food production, and in developing countries, as much as 80% of food crops. More recent estimates claim that half of the world's food and in developing countries, between 60-80% of food crops are the results of growth from seeds that have been planted by a woman's hand. This persistence of traditional divisions of labor, in which women hold primary responsibility for producing food, as well as other labor-intensive tasks such as gather water and fuel, contributes to the large percentage of women informally working in rural areas. The roles that women play differ significantly by region, with an average of 43% of the agricultural labor force in developing countries, ranging from 20% in Latin America to 50% in Eastern Asia and sub-Saharan Africa. Thus, in addition to increasing vulnerability and reducing status, exclusion of women from the decision making process and the control and transfer of land has also led to a decrease in food security and sustainable development.

Shifting systems
Though women's lack of formal control over land and resources has long persisting historical roots, economies and societies undergoing extensive change have created deep implications for ownership rights. In subsistence production systems, access to land was determined by status within the family rather than actual ownership rights; resulting in both men and women having “user rights” to produce food for their families.  The combined processes of industrialization and globalization have disrupted longstanding livelihoods and systems of production, forcing many families to focus more on income-generating activities than on subsistence practices. However, increasing women's access to property rights has numerous significant economic benefits for the overall community as well as psychological and social benefits for the lives of women, themselves, especially in agricultural societies. Economically, when women have greater access to land-ownership in rural areas, which started being implemented by the government following the 20th century mandates on property laws in order to ultimately promote greater gender equality, women begin to independently cultivate their own land (given to them either by the state itself, allocated otherwise through the private market, or passed on by a male relative), form women collectives to learn more about agricultural practices as well as profit-generating skills and ultimately, have yielded more output from that given land than the previous owners. Further, the psychological benefits from increasing women's access to property rights is that this leads to a significant decrease in instances of marital domestic violence. All of these factors would contribute positively to the economic growth of that given community in the long-term by experiencing greater overall labor force participation rates, increased income generation and greater investment in child healthcare and education, also thereby combating malnutrition and breaking out of the poverty cycle.

Impact of gender bias
The typical process of agrarian transformation under which labor shifts from agriculture to nonagricultural has occurred slowly and with heavy gender-bias. Because women's property rights are often assumed through the security of the oftentimes, male, household head, some inheritance laws allocate less property to female heirs than male heirs. Ongoing adherence to male-dominated traditions of property ownership has generally meant that women cannot take advantage of the wide range of benefits associated with ownership and control of property. According to the Land Tenure Service at FAO, poverty is inversely correlated with household land ownership and direct access to land minimizes women's risk of impoverishment and improvements the physical well-being and prospects for children.

Land titles
The process of titling has been administered with strong gender bias, with women usually denied equal ownership rights. Furthermore, property and inheritance claims are generally processed through loosely organized administrative bodies consisting of local leaders and clerks with limited legal training. Closer inspection of the decision makers, notes a body of mostly males.

Patriarchal property rights
Women who are potentially able to meet their subsistence needs on their own may threaten to leave the household if they are not given a large share of the surplus. However, due to patriarchal property rights, husbands control over the allocation of wives’ labor time, husbands can make decisions that reduce the value of their wives’ alternatives to marriage. Both the right to manage land and control the income from production, encompassing secure rights to land access, have much deeper implications than mere access. For many women, access to land and property are essential to the production of food as well as sustainable livelihoods, but are dependent on natal and marital affiliations. In many countries, women can lose rights to land when there is a change in marital status, including marriage, divorce, or even death of a spouse.

Male dominance
Because of the worldwide prevalence of patrilineal inheritance customs, both productive resources and property such as household goods have ended up in the hands of men and not women. When only men have rights of inheritance or family succession, women have little opportunity to improve their status or living conditions within the family and community. Consequently, they are rendered dependent on male relatives for survival and have little say over how property is used to generate income or to support families. Additionally, within patrilineal communities, there is a strong resistance by men towards endowing women, especially daughters, with rights to land access.

Barriers to change status

Inadequate laws and systems of enforcement
While there are a growing number of contemporary laws, as framed by the modern State, which give inheritance rights to daughters when they are recognized as individuals among the communities, the process of marriage and the traditionally patrilineal customs have remained largely unchanged. Thus, there remains a mismatch between marriage practices and inheritance laws, with the strength and biases of the marriage practice often overriding inheritance laws. This is also evidenced in the process of dowry practices. In many cultures, a daughter's dowry is viewed by her family as her direct portion of her inheritance, even though it may be typically absorbed by the new husband and his family. Thus, while in some communities women do have the formal rights to inherit lands, the social representation of inheritance in the form of dowries and the strength of the practice of marriage trump given laws.

Lack of awareness existing laws and insufficient understanding of legal redress options
Levels of education, oftentimes products of restrictions on women's interaction with institutions which are primarily composed of men, create a mystique and illusion about legal actions. Additionally, ideologies about the conduct that a woman displays, normally taking the form of docility, can bring shame to the idea of challenging persisting gender inequalities in law, policy and land rights.

Prevalence of traditional attitudes and practices
Gender ideologies, or beliefs and stereotypes of the expected characteristics of a particular gender, provide a barrier for women to gain property rights and enhance status. These ideologies may take the form of assumptions of the role that a woman plays in society, her needs or capabilities, which thus affect the way that an issue is framed and implemented.

See also 
Family law
Feminism
Land law
Legal rights of women in history
Married Women's Property Acts in the United States
Married Women's Property Act 1882
Primogeniture

References

Property law
Women's rights